S. aurantiaca may refer to:
 Sandersonia aurantiaca, the Christmas bell, golden lily of the valley or Chinese lantern lily, a perennial plant species native to South Africa
 Schinia aurantiaca, a moth species found in North America
 Sepiola aurantiaca, the golden bobtail, a squid species native to the northeastern Atlantic Ocean
 Stigmatella aurantiaca, a myxobacterium species

See also 
 Aurantiaca